

Buildings and structures

Buildings
 1720s BC – Knossos rebuilt
 Karnak Temple begun
 Royal Palace of Mari is built

References 

Architecture